Erythroseris amabilis is a species of flowering plant in the family Asteraceae. It is found only in the Socotra Islands, part of the Republic of Yemen.
Its natural habitats are subtropical or tropical dry forests and rocky areas. It is listed as an endangered species by the IUCN under the basionym Prenanthes amabilis.

References

Cichorieae
Endemic flora of Socotra
Endangered flora of Africa
Taxonomy articles created by Polbot
Taxa named by Isaac Bayley Balfour